A millimetre of mercury is a manometric   unit of pressure, formerly defined as the extra pressure generated by a column of mercury one millimetre high, and currently defined as exactly  pascals. It is denoted mmHg or mm Hg.

Although not an SI unit, the millimetre of mercury is still routinely used in medicine, meteorology, aviation, and many other scientific fields.

Although the two units are not equal, the relative difference (less than ) is negligible for most practical uses.

History

For much of human history, the pressure of gases like air was ignored, denied, or taken for granted, but as early as the 6th century BC, Greek philosopher Anaximenes of Miletus claimed that all things are made of air that is simply changed by varying levels of pressure. He could observe water evaporating, changing to a gas, and felt that this applied even to solid matter. More condensed air made colder, heavier objects, and expanded air made lighter, hotter objects. This was akin to how gases become less dense when warmer and more dense when cooler. 

In the 17th century, Evangelista Torricelli conducted experiments with mercury that allowed him to measure the presence of air. He would dip a glass tube, closed at one end, into a bowl of mercury and raise the closed end up out of it, keeping the open end submerged. The weight of the mercury would pull it down, leaving a partial vacuum at the far end. This validated his belief that air/gas has mass, creating pressure on things around it. Previously, the more popular conclusion, even for Galileo, was that air was weightless and it is vacuum that provided force, as in a siphon. The discovery helped bring Torricelli to the conclusion:

This test, known as Torricelli's experiment, was essentially the first documented pressure gauge.

Blaise Pascal went farther, having his brother-in-law try the experiment at different altitudes on a mountain, and finding indeed that the farther down in the ocean of atmosphere, the higher the pressure.

Mercury manometers were the first accurate pressure gauges. They are less used today due to mercury's toxicity, the mercury column's sensitivity to temperature and local gravity, and the greater convenience of other instrumentation.  They displayed the pressure difference between two fluids as a vertical difference between the mercury levels in two connected reservoirs. 

An actual mercury column reading may be converted to more fundamental units of pressure by multiplying the difference in height between two mercury levels by the density of mercury and the local gravitational acceleration. Because the specific weight of mercury depends on temperature and surface gravity, both of which vary with local conditions, specific standard values for these two parameters were adopted. This resulted in defining a "millimetre of mercury" as the pressure exerted at the base of a column of mercury 1 millimetre high with a precise density of  when the acceleration due to gravity is exactly .

The use of an actual column of mercury to measure pressure normally requires correction for the density of mercury at the actual temperature and the sometimes significant variation of gravity with location, and may be further corrected to take account of the density of the measured air, water or other fluid.

Each millimetre of mercury can be divided into 1000 micrometres of mercury, denoted μmHg or simply microns.

Relation to the torr
The precision of modern transducers is often insufficient to show the difference between the torr and the millimetre of mercury. By the same factor, a millitorr is slightly less than a micrometre of mercury.

Use in medicine and physiology
In medicine, pressure is still generally measured in millimetres of mercury. These measurements are in general given relative to the current atmospheric pressure: for example, a blood pressure of 120 mmHg, when the current atmospheric pressure is 760 mmHg, means 880 mmHg relative to perfect vacuum.

Routine pressure measurements in medicine include:
 Blood pressure, measured with a sphygmomanometer
 Intraocular pressure, with a tonometer
 Cerebrospinal fluid pressure
 Intracranial pressure
 Intramuscular pressure (compartment syndrome)
 Central venous pressure
 Pulmonary artery catheterization
 Mechanical ventilation

In physiology manometric units are used to measure Starling forces.

See also
 Bar (unit)
 Inch of mercury
 Inch of water
 Pound per square inch
 Torr

References

Units of pressure
Mercury (element)